Raymundo Escamilla González (born 29 April 1964) is a Mexican politician from the Party of the Democratic Revolution. In 2009 he served as Deputy of the LX Legislature of the Mexican Congress representing the State of Mexico.

References

1964 births
Living people
Politicians from the State of Mexico
Party of the Democratic Revolution politicians
21st-century Mexican politicians
Deputies of the LX Legislature of Mexico
Members of the Chamber of Deputies (Mexico) for the State of Mexico